= Vernon Hoium =

American politician

Member of the Minnesota Senate from the 51st district
- In office 1963–1966

Personal details
- Born: March 7, 1930 (age 96) Minneapolis, Minnesota, U.S.
- Party: Liberal
- Children: 2
- Education: University of Minnesota Law School
- Occupation: attorney

Vernon Stanley Hoium (born March 7, 1930) is an American politician in the state of Minnesota. He served in the Minnesota State Senate from 1963 to 1966. He is a lawyer.
